The State of Madura was a federal state (negara bagian) formed on the Indonesian island of Madura by the Netherlands in 1948 as part of an attempt to reestablish the colony of the Dutch East Indies during the Indonesian National Revolution.  It included Madura and neighbouring islands that now form part of the current province of East Java.

The state was established on 23 January 1948 by governor of the Dutch East Java Charles van der Plas, the right-hand man of Hubertus van Mook.  On 20 February 1948, the Dutch Government recognized the establishment of the state.   R.A.A. Tjakraningrat was elected governor of Madura.  The state became a constituent part of the United States of Indonesia in 1949 but, because of pressure from pro-Republican forces, the state was disbanded and merged into the Republic of Indonesia on 9 March 1950.

Person of interests
 Tjakraningrat
 Srigati Santoso
 Suparmo Honggopati Tjotro Hupojo

See also

History of Indonesia
Indonesian National Revolution
Indonesian regions

Reference

Indonesian National Revolution